Cheboygan County is a county in the U.S. state of Michigan. As of the 2020 Census, the population was 25,579. The county seat is Cheboygan. The county boundaries were set off in 1840, with land partitioned from Mackinac County. The Cheboygan County government was organized in 1853.

Etymology of the name Cheboygan
The name of the county shares the same origin as that of the Cheboygan River, although the precise meaning is no longer known. It may have come from an Ojibwe word zhaabonigan, meaning "sewing needle". Alternatively, the origin may have been Chabwegan, meaning "a place of ore". It has also been described as "a Native American word first applied to the river. See List of Michigan county name etymologies. "Cheboygan" is pronounced the same as "Sheboygan" (a city in Wisconsin).

Geography
The county is considered to be part of Northern Michigan.

Adjacent counties
By land
 Presque Isle County - east
 Montmorency County - southeast
 Otsego County - south
 Charlevoix County - southwest
 Emmet County - west
By water

 Mackinac County - north

Transportation

Highways

 
 
 
 
 
 
  (former highway)

County-designated highways

Airports
 Cheboygan County Airport, located in Cheboygan, is a private airport. There are no commercial airline airports in Cheboygan County but the nearest ones are Alpena County Regional Airport, Chippewa County International Airport (Sault Ste. Marie, MI), and Cherry Capital Airport (Traverse City). Delta Air Lines schedules flights daily out of the Pellston Regional Airport.

Demographics

As of the 2000 United States Census, there were 26,448 people, 10,835 households, and 7,573 families in the county. The population density was 37 people per square mile (14/km2). There were 16,583 housing units at an average density of 23 per square mile (9/km2). The racial makeup of the county was 94.80% White, 0.25% Black or African American, 2.55% Native American, 0.20% Asian, 0.02% Pacific Islander, 0.15% from other races, and 2.05% from two or more races. 0.76% of the population were Hispanic or Latino of any race. 21.4% were of German, 10.4% English, 10.0% French, 9.5% Polish, 9.2% American and 8.9% Irish ancestry. 97.7% spoke English as their first language.

There were 10,835 households, out of which 28.60% had children under the age of 18 living with them, 58.00% were married couples living together, 8.60% had a female householder with no husband present, and 30.10% were non-families. 25.80% of all households were made up of individuals, and 11.80% had someone living alone who was 65 years of age or older. The average household size was 2.41 and the average family size was 2.87.

The county population contained 23.70% under the age of 18, 6.20% from 18 to 24, 25.80% from 25 to 44, 26.30% from 45 to 64, and 17.90% who were 65 years of age or older. The median age was 41 years. For every 100 females there were 98.30 males. For every 100 females age 18 and over, there were 96.50 males.

The median income for a household in the county was $33,417, and the median income for a family was $38,390. Males had a median income of $30,054 versus $20,682 for females. The per capita income for the county was $18,088. About 8.70% of families and 12.20% of the population were below the poverty line, including 17.90% of those under age 18 and 7.10% of those age 65 or over.

Government
Cheyboygan County has tended to vote Republican through the years. Since 1884 its voters have selected the Republican Party nominee in 71% (24 of 35) of the national elections.

Cheyboygan County operates the County jail, maintains rural roads, operates the major local courts, records deeds, mortgages, and vital records, administers public health regulations, and participates with the state in the provision of social services. The county board of commissioners controls the budget and has limited authority to make laws or ordinances. In Michigan, most local government functions – police and fire, building and zoning, tax assessment, street maintenance etc. – are the responsibility of individual cities and townships.

Elected officials

 Prosecuting Attorney: Daryl P. Vizina
 Sheriff: Dale V. Clarmont
 County Clerk/Register of Deeds: Karen Brewster
 County Treasurer: Buffy Jo Werdon
 Drain Commissioner: Cameron Cavitt
 County Surveyor: James H. Granger

(information as of September 2018)

Communities

City
 Cheboygan (county seat)

Villages
 Mackinaw City (part)
 Wolverine

Civil townships

 Aloha Township
 Beaugrand Township
 Benton Township
 Burt Township
 Duncan Township (defunct)
 Ellis Township
 Forest Township
 Grant Township
 Hebron Township
 Inverness Township
 Koehler Township
 Mackinaw Township
 Maple Grove Township (defunct)
 Mentor Township
 Mullett Township
 Munro Township
 Nunda Township
 Tuscarora Township
 Walker Township
 Waverly Township
 Wilmot Township

Census-designated places
 Indian River
 Tower

Other unincorporated communities

 Afton
 Aloha
 Alverno
 Birchwood
 Burt Lake
 Cordwood Point
 Dow
 Elmhurst
 Fingerboard Corner
 Freedom
 Geyersville
 Giauque Beach
 Grand View
 Haakwood
 Long Point
 Mullett Lake
 Mullett Lake Woods
 Orchard Beach
 Point Landing
 Pries Landing
 Riggsville
 Rondo
 Royal Oak
 Silver Beach
 Topinabee
 Veery Point
 Wildwood

Historical markers

There are eight recognized Michigan historical markers in the county:

 Forty Mile Point Lighthouse / Graveyard of Ships
 Inland Waterway
 Jacob J. Post House
 Jail and Sheriff's Residence
 Newton-Allaire House
 Old Cheboygan County Courthouse
 St. Bernard Catholic Church
 St. Mary's Church

See also
 List of Michigan State Historic Sites in Cheboygan County, Michigan
 National Register of Historic Places listings in Cheboygan County, Michigan
 USS Cheboygan County (LST-533)
 History of Northern Michigan

References

External links
 Cheboygan County official site
 
 Cheboygan County's Historic Bridges
 Enchanted forest, Northern Michigan source for information, calendars, etc.
 YourCheboygan.org, Open forum for community feedback

 
Michigan counties
1853 establishments in Michigan
Populated places established in 1853